Richard Kingi (born 17 March 1989 in Tauranga, New Zealand) is an Australian professional Rugby union footballer. While his usual position is half back, he often plays on the wing and sometimes at fullback.

Career
Brought up in Te Puke near the Bay of Plenty, Kingi's family moved to Australia when he was 15 years old.

He played for Sunnybank rugby club, before going onto representative football that included the Queensland U19s, U20s, the IRB Junior World Championships and the Australian Sevens. He travelled with the Wallabies spring tour of Japan and Great Britain in 2009, and made his Wallabies debut against the Cardiff Blues.

In 2009–10 Kingi was reserve halfback for the Queensland Reds, behind Will Genia. He signed a two-year deal with the Melbourne Rebels in March 2010, and in 2011 his competitors for the Rebels halfback role were Nick Phipps, and former Wallaby Sam Cordingley.

In October 2010, Kingi was named as one of 12 uncapped players in the Wallabies' 40-man squad to train for its tour of Hong Kong and Europe. When he wasn't required for Wallabies training he travelled to Lorne to be part of the Rebels' pre-season team-building activities.

Griffith university colleges knights 
As of the 2019 season Kingi has signed on as Backs coach and Fly Half for the Knights in the Gold Coast District Rugby Union competition. As of 18 May he has led them to 6 wins from 6 appearances.
He has also been instrumental in the Knights Women's 7's program acting as Coach and Mentor for the girls.

Personal life and relatives
Kingi and his wife Sharna are parents of five children. His cousin Tanerau Latimer is a Chiefs flanker, New Zealand Maori representative and former All Black.

References

External links 
 Richard Kingi Melbourne Rebels profile

1989 births
Australian rugby union players
Melbourne Rebels players
Queensland Reds players
Stade Français players
Rugby union scrum-halves
Rugby union wings
Rugby union fullbacks
New Zealand emigrants to Australia
Expatriate rugby union players in France
People educated at Keebra Park State High School
People from Te Puke
Living people
Australian expatriate rugby union players
Expatriate rugby union players in Russia
Yenisey-STM Krasnoyarsk players
Rugby union players from Tauranga